Nicholas Frank Taubman (born 1935) is a United States businessman, politician, and ambassador. He served as the United States Ambassador to Romania 2005–2008.

Early life

Nicholas Taubman was born 1935 in Roanoke, Virginia to parents Arthur Taubman and Grace.  He graduated from Mercersburg Academy, a private college preparatory school, in 1953, then attended the Wharton School of the University of Pennsylvania, where he graduated with a Bachelor of Science degree in economics.

He served in the U.S. Army from 1957 to 1958, and from 1960 to 1961.

Business career

From 1969 to 2005, Taubman served as President and CEO of Advance Auto Parts, a chain of auto parts stores founded by his father Arthur Taubman.

Politics

Taubman served on the Roanoke City Council from 1976 to 1978.

Taubman was appointed U.S. Ambassador to Romania by President George W. Bush in November 2005 and served until December 2008.

Philanthropy

Taubman and his wife Jenny are the largest donors to the new Art Museum of Western Virginia, having pledged over $15 million.  In recognition, the new museum was renamed the Taubman Museum of Art.

See also
 U.S. Department of State – Biography of Nicholas Frank Taubman

References

1935 births
Living people
Ambassadors of the United States to Romania
Jewish American military personnel
Jewish American philanthropists
United States Army soldiers
Mercersburg Academy alumni
Virginia Republicans
Politicians from Roanoke, Virginia
Virginia city council members
Wharton School of the University of Pennsylvania alumni
21st-century American Jews